Si Si Senor is a 1930 American comedy film directed by Fatty Arbuckle and starring Tom Patricola.

Cast
 Tom Patricola
 Joe Phillips
 Chaquita de Montes
 Carmel Guerrox

See also
 Fatty Arbuckle filmography

References

External links

1930 films
Films directed by Roscoe Arbuckle
1930 comedy films
Educational Pictures short films
1930 short films
American comedy short films
1930s English-language films
1930s American films